St Edward's Gaelic Athletic Association (GAA) is an amalgamation consisting of Rathcoffey GAA, Straffan GAA and Cappagh GAA clubs for the purposes of fielding juvenile football teams. St Edward's fields teams with Rathcoffey and Straffan GAA at all official age groups from Under 8 up to Under 14. From Under 15 to Under 21 the St Edwards amalgamation includes Cappagh GAA.

Gaelic games clubs in County Kildare
Gaelic football clubs in County Kildare